Felix & Paul Studios is a Canadian creator of immersive virtual reality (VR) entertainment. The studio is known for its originals Space Explorers: The ISS Experience, and Traveling While Black.

Felix & Paul Studios is recognized as an official implementation partner by the ISS National Lab. The studio has earned five Canadian Screen Awards, two Primetime Emmy Awards, and a Daytime Emmy, along with numerous other awards and acknowledgments.

History
Felix & Paul Studios was founded in 2013 by directors Félix Lajeunesse and Paul Raphaël and producer Stéphane Rituit. Lajeunesse and Raphael teamed up to co-direct music videos and commercials. Eventually, they turned their attention to immersive cinematic experiences, creating 3D film installations. Felix & Paul Studios' first VR experience, Strangers With Patrick Watson, was released at South by Southwest in 2014.

Selected filmography

Space Explorers: The ISS Experience
Space Explorers: The ISS Experience, produced in association with Time Studios is the largest production ever filmed entirely in space.

The Infinite
The first multisensory and interactive virtual reality experience aboard the International Space Station. The Infinite is an extension of the virtual reality series Space Explorers: The ISS Experience.

Awards and nominations

References

External links
 

Virtual reality
Virtual reality companies
Entertainment companies of Canada
Mass media companies established in 2013